Mikayla Pivec (born November 18, 1997) is an American basketball player for Club Deportivo Promete of La Liga Feminina in Spain. Born in Bellevue, Washington, Pivec went to Lynnwood High School and played collegiately for Oregon State University. She was drafted by the Atlanta Dream with the 25th overall pick of the 2020 WNBA draft. In May, with the 2020 WNBA season in jeopardy due to the COVID-19 pandemic in the United States, Pivec opted out of the season. On July 13, it was announced Pivec had signed a one-year contract with Club Deportivo Promete in Spain. Pivec is expected to return to Atlanta Dream training camp in 2021 for an opportunity to earn a roster spot.

References 

Living people
Atlanta Dream draft picks
Guards (basketball)
Oregon State Beavers women's basketball players
American expatriate basketball people in Spain
People from Bothell, Washington
Basketball players from Washington (state)
American women's basketball players
1997 births
Basketball players at the 2019 Pan American Games
Pan American Games silver medalists for the United States
Pan American Games medalists in basketball
Medalists at the 2019 Pan American Games